Il convitato di pietra is a 1832 opera by Pacini originally written for private performance by the composer's own family and friends. The libretto by Gaetano Barbieri, librettist of Il Talismano, was compiled from earlier librettos telling the story of Mozart's Don Giovanni, including Bertati's for Gazzaniga, but with changes including the removal of the role of Elvira.

Original cast

Recording
Il convitato di pietra: Don Giovanni - Leonardo Cortellazzi (tenor); Donna Anna - Geraldine Chauvet (mezzo); Zerlina - Zinovia Maria Zafeiriadou (soprano); Masetto - Ugo Guagliardo (bass); Duca Ottavio - Giorgio Trucco (tenor); Il Commendatore - Ugo Guagliardo (Bass); Ficcanaso - Giulio Mastrototaro (baritone)  Transylvania State Philharmonic Choir, Cluj Südwestdeutsches Kammerorchester Pforzheim,  Daniele Ferrari  1–2, 4 July; 4 July 2008; Jubilee 20th Rossini in Wildbad Festival

References

Italian-language operas
Operas by Giovanni Pacini
1832 operas